East Southsea was the name of a 1904 terminus railway station of the 1.25 mile Southsea Railway, which linked the Southsea seaside resort with the Portsmouth Direct Line at Fratton railway station. It replaced a larger, grander earlier station building named Southsea railway station, which opened in 1885.

History

Southsea railway station (1885-1904)
The first terminus station of the Southsea Railway was named Southsea and was built in a grand Queen Anne style.

Southsea station, along with the Southsea Railway and Fratton railway station were jointly opened on 1 July 1885 by Lady Ada Mary Willis (née Neeld), wife of General Sir George Willis, the Lieutenant Governor of Portsmouth. The Southsea Railway was built to serve the fashionable Victorian seaside resort of Southsea, and at its northern end, the Southsea Railway connected to the Portsmouth Direct Line at Fratton railway station.

East Southsea railway station (1904-1914)
By the twentieth century, the Southsea Railway was experiencing competition with Portsmouth Corporation Transport trams and trolleybuses. The steam-powered railcars had small wheels and allegedly gave passengers a bumpy ride. As a cost-cutting measure, the Southsea Railway leased out the original 1885 Southsea station building in 1904, which become a motor engineers garage.

In 1904, East Southsea station was joined by two unstaffed halt stations at Albert Road and Jessie Road, added to the Southsea Railway line. These additions were initially a success, but were unable to compete with Portsmouth's burgeoning tramway network and passenger numbers began to decline.

Closure, First World War and fate
By 1914, the threat of the First World War loomed. The final nail in the Southsea Railway's coffin was a government directive issued shortly after the declaration of war to the effect that railways unable to support themselves would cease operations at the earliest opportunity; and, as the line clearly fell into this category, the last train ran on 6 August 1914. The original 1885 Southsea station at Granada Road was used as a munitions store during the war., while the rail line itself served as an additional overflow siding from Fratton railway station's goods yard.

After the war, the Southsea Railway and its stations lay abandoned. Partial removal of the line was sanctioned by Section 55 of the Southern Railway Act 1923. The 1885 Southsea station at Granada Road was converted into a road vehicle garage business, until it was fully demolished and cleared in the 1970s.

Legacy
After the demise of the Southsea Railway, Fratton & Southsea station reverted to its original Fratton name on 1 December 1921.

The Southsea name was later transferred to Portsmouth's main Portsmouth Town railway station in 1925 creating the present-day Portsmouth & Southsea railway station name.

The site of Southsea's terminus station is now occupied by a late twentieth century residential cul-de-sac named Chewter Close, just to the north of Granada Road in Southsea. The original 1885 terminus station building was located at the northern end of today's Chewter Close until its demolition in the 1970s. A mural commemorating the station was unveiled on the northernmost wall in Chewter Close on 26 August 2011. This wall was not part of the original Southsea station building, as the wall was built after the railway line closed and was built as a boundary wall between the rear gardens of newer inter-war period houses that became Parkstone Avenue and the garage business that occupied the original station building.  The smaller, later East Southsea station site is now occupied by modern houses close to the junction of Chewter Close and Granada Road.

See also 
 List of closed railway stations in Britain

References

External links 
Fate of old station
Bibliography

Disused railway stations in Portsmouth
Former Portsmouth and Ryde Joint Railway stations
Railway stations in Great Britain opened in 1885
Railway stations in Great Britain closed in 1914